Mollys Castle is a remote 5,265-foot (1,605-meter) elevation summit located near Goblin Valley State Park, in Emery County, Utah. The top of this magnificent butte rises 265 feet above its surrounding terrain. Precipitation runoff from Mollys Castle enters the Colorado River drainage basin.

Geology
Mollys Castle is a geological feature set within the San Rafael Desert on the southeastern edge of the San Rafael Swell. This erosional remnant is composed of Jurassic rock. The thin, light-colored layer on top is Curtis Formation caprock, overlaying darker, reddish Entrada Sandstone, which is also the composition of the hoodoos that give Goblin Valley its name.

Climate
Spring and fall are the most favorable seasons to visit Mollys Castle. According to the Köppen climate classification system, it is located in a Cold semi-arid climate zone, which is defined by the coldest month having an average mean temperature below −0 °C (32 °F) and at least 50% of the total annual precipitation being received during the spring and summer.

Gallery

See also
 Colorado Plateau

References

External links
 Mollys Castle: weather forecast

Landforms of Emery County, Utah
Colorado Plateau
Rock formations of Utah
San Rafael Swell
Buttes of Utah
Sandstone formations of the United States
North American 1000 m summits